Trichostema lanatum, the woolly bluecurls, is a small evergreen shrub or sub-shrub native to arid coastal chaparral regions of California and the northern parts of Baja California.

Trichostema lanatum is many-branched and grows to 1.5 m (5 ft) tall, with narrow, pointed green leaves.  The smooth-petaled blue flowers are borne in dense clusters, with the stem and calyces covered in woolly hairs of blue, pink, or white. Flowers are present from March to June.

Spanish explorers in California called the plant romero, the Spanish term for rosemary, and that common name is still sometimes used.

Uses
Trichostema lanatum is cultivated as an ornamental plant, and several cultivars have been developed. It attracts hummingbirds and bumblebees.

It is aromatic and glandular. Native Americans used it for a variety of medicinal and other purposes.

It makes a flavorful tea.

References

External links
Jepson Manual Treatment — Trichostema lanatum
Trichostema lanatum — U.C. Photo gallery

lanatum
Flora of California
Flora of Baja California
Natural history of the California chaparral and woodlands
Natural history of the California Coast Ranges
Natural history of the Peninsular Ranges
Natural history of the Santa Monica Mountains
Natural history of the Transverse Ranges
Plants used in traditional Native American medicine
Bird food plants
Garden plants of North America
Drought-tolerant plants
Flora without expected TNC conservation status